Mirandaphera cayrei is a species of sea snail, a marine gastropod mollusk in the family Cancellariidae, the nutmeg snails.

Description

Distribution
This marine species occurs off New Caledonia.

References

Cancellariidae
Gastropods described in 2002